Club Sportivo Independiente Rivadavia (mostly known simply as Independiente Rivadavia) is a football club from Mendoza, Argentina. The team currently plays in Primera B Nacional, the second major league in Argentine Football league system.

Independiente Rivadavia played in the Argentine Primera in 1968, 1973, 1977, 1979–80 and 1982, when the team reached the quarter-finals of the National Championship. That year Independiente was eliminated in the play-offs by the team that would later reach the Championship, Ferro Carril Oeste.

Honours
 Torneo Argentino A (2): 1999, 2006–07

Players

Current squad

Former players

Managers
  Juan Carlos Murúa (1983–85)
  Claudio "Turco" García
  Darío Felman (2003–04)
  Roque Alfaro (2006)
  Roberto Trotta (2006–07), (2007–08)
  Fernando Quiroz (2009–10)
  Jorge Luis Ghiso (2010)
  Roberto Trotta (2013–14)
  Ricardo Rodriguez (2014)
  Daniel Garnero (2014-2015)
  Pablo Quinteros (2015-2016)
  Felipe Canedo (2016)
  Daniel Cordoba (2016)
  Martin Astudillo (2016-2017)
  Alfredo Berti (2017)
  José Romero (2017)
  Pablo de Muner (2017)
  Gabriel Gómez (2017-2019)
  Luciano Theiler (2019)
  Matías Minich (2019-2020)
  Marcelo Straccia (2020-2021)
  Gabriel Gómez (2021-2022)
  Ever Demalde (2022-now)

References

External links
 
 Official Site (archived)

 
Football clubs in Mendoza Province
Association football clubs established in 1913
Independiente Rivadavia